The ghost shiner (Notropis buchanani) is a North American species of freshwater fish of the family Cyprinidae. It is generally characterized as being a small bodied, silvery and fusiform shaped cyprinid. Notropis buchanani is morphologically similar to and often mistaken for the Mimic Shiner (Notropis volucellus), which is evident by its former classification as a subspecies of Notropis volucellus.

Geographic distribution
The current range for Notropis buchanani extends from the Mississippi River basin in the southern United States to Ontario in southern Canada.  Populations have been reported in eastern Kansas, southeastern Nebraska, western Oklahoma and south to northern Alabama, Mississippi, and Louisiana.  Populations of N. buchanani are also present in Gulf slope drainages in Texas, Louisiana, and Mexico. In 1993, populations were found in southern Ontario. The trend in the United States is that the farther north the state is from the Gulf Coast, the less secure populations of N. buchanani become. In Ontario, the population is apparently stable.

The first population of Notropis buchanani in Ontario was discovered in the Thames River watershed in 1979. After the discovery, the Canadian Museum of Nature was checked for similar species of Notropis, and a specimen of Notropis buchanani was found to have previously been collected from Mollys Creek in 1972. The population in southern Ontario has been thought to have been introduced in the 1970s; however, recent studies suggest that it is native to Canada due to natural migration after deglaciation.

Ecology
The diet of Notropis buchanani has not been studied yet, but the diet of adults probably consists of insects, phytoplankton, and benthic crustaceans. Notropis buchanani are benthopelagic freshwater fish that generally inhabit areas with slow currents in lower magnitude streams of orders one to four. In the higher order streams, N. buchanani are characteristic of low-gradient sections of creeks and rivers with moderate flow and moderately clear to turbid waters. They also inhabit larger pools and protected backwaters without noticeable current in stream orders from one to four. Streams with submerged vegetation create suitable habitat for N. buchanani species, as many species have been found in submerged vegetation in the Ohio River valley. Impoundments such as dams have a negative impact on the species' abundance because they limit their range. Dams that are less than 12 feet high do not have to be reported as dams, and these pose a significant risk to populations of Notropis buchanani because they are unregulated.

Life history
Populations of Notropis buchanani usually breed in the second year of life during the period from May until late August depending on the location of the populations. In Tennessee, N. buchanani were reported to be in a reproductive state in late May, while in Kansas breeding individuals were found in mid-August. The majority of the populations breed during their second summer, and relatively few breed during the third because their lifespan is three years. Notropis buchanani spawn in rivers with sluggish sand or gravel riffles. In Tennessee, the spawning occurs in slow moving, silt covered gravel areas in the Stones River below the Walter Hill Dam or in the silty sand substrate of the Mississippi River in northwest part of the state. During the breeding season, males develop nuptial tubercles, particularly on the snout, internasal region, orbit, and underside of the lower jaw. The anterior pectoral rays are slightly thickened, and small blunt tubercles are densely packed along the dorsal surface of rays 2-6. For Notropis buchanani, the year of the young in October are on average 0.8” to 1.5” long. At one year, they are an average of 1.1” to 2.3 inches long, and as adults individuals grow to an average of  1.3” to 2.3” inches. The largest species of Notropis buchanani caught was recorded at a length of 2.6”.

Management
Currently, there are no widely used management practices to monitor Notropis buchanani. Populations are stable in southern drainages and all states that populations of the species exist in, and the species has a low vulnerability compared to other species of Notropis.  Notropis buchanani was previously listed as a protected species in Ohio due to habitat loss according to the American Fisheries Society. It is currently not listed as threatened or endangered in any of the states the populations exist in. Information on the historical distributions and success of Notropis buchanani is not accessible before 1920 because the species was thought to be a subspecies of Notropis volucellus. The abundance of N. buchanani was considered to be larger before it was discovered in Ohio in 1930. Habitat loss is thought to be a large factor in the decline of populations in the Ohio River Basin. The impounding of waters through damming creates a natural barrier for populations. A 1947 collection of the species was taken from lower Norris Reservoir that suggests the range of N. buchanani extended farther up the Tennessee River. The population survived for roughly 10 years after the completion of the reservoir, but it is now considered extirpated, as TVA biologists failed to capture any recent specimens after frequent sampling. State and Federal Fish and Wildlife agencies are monitoring the abundance of populations of Notropis buchanani as well as the other native and non-native freshwater fish, but due to the stabilization of species, no specific actions have been designed to help mitigate the risk for the loss of the species. Notropis buchanani was previously listed as a protected species in Ohio due to habitat loss according to the American Fisheries Society, but it is currently not listed as threatened or endangered in any of the states that populations of the species occur.

References

External links
 GLANSIS Species FactSheet
 

Notropis
Fish described in 1896